Lisa Emery is an American stage, film, and television actress. Emery is best known for playing Darlene Snell on Netflix series Ozark.

Early life
Emery was born in Pittsburgh, Pennsylvania, the daughter of an aspiring actress from Charlottesville, Virginia and an advertising executive who worked in Valley Forge, Pennsylvania. She attended Hollins College, where she planned to study painting, but became interested in drama classes instead because "they were having way more fun." After graduation she studied at the Circle in the Square Theatre School for a year, then began to audition.

Emery moved to New York with her then-longtime boyfriend. They eventually broke up and she enrolled in the Circle in the Square two-year program. She moved to the East Village in 1982.

Career
Emery's theatre credits include The Matchmaker, Dinner with Friends (1999), What the Butler Saw (2000), The Prime of Miss Jean Brodie (2006), Talley & Son, Burn This (1987), Rumors, Present Laughter, The Women (2001), Marvin's Room (1991), Abigail's Party (2005), and Relatively Speaking (2011). She has been nominated for the Drama Desk Award for Outstanding Featured Actress in a Play three times.

Emery's film credits include A Map of the World, Unfaithful, The Night Listener, and Margot at the Wedding. On television she had a reoccurring role on Ed and has made guest appearances on Law & Order, Sex and the City, Law & Order: Special Victims Unit, Law & Order: Criminal Intent, Third Watch, Fringe, Damages and Jessica Jones. She also had a cast role on Ozark.

Charles Isherwood, in his review of Relatively Speaking (George Is Dead by Elaine May) for The New York Times, wrote of Emery: "Carla, a thankless straight-woman role played with skill by the fine Lisa Emery..."

In a July 2020 interview for The Natural Aristocrat, Emery spoke about enjoying the unpredictable nature of her Ozark character Darlene Snell. "Every time I get a script, I’m surprised, which is great. It’s not like, ‘Oh, there she goes again!’ I think it’s unpredictable what a great mother she is in her own way."

Personal life 
Emery was married to actor Josh Pais; their son, Zane, appeared with his mother in Margot at the Wedding.

Emery did not seek a film or television career and did not think of career strategies. "I take it as it comes... Perhaps I'd regret it if I were less happy now. I live perfectly well and love what I do."

Awards and nominations
 Drama Desk Award 2011, Outstanding Featured Actress in a Play	- The Collection & A Kind of Alaska (nominee)
 Drama Desk Award 2006, Outstanding Featured Actress in a Play - Abigail's Party (nominee)
 Drama Desk Award 1992, Outstanding Featured Actress in a Play - Marvin's Room (nominee)
 Lucille Lortel Award 2009, Outstanding Featured Actress - Distracted (nominee)
 Lucille Lortel Award 2006, Outstanding Featured Actress - Abigail's Party (nominee)
 Lucille Lortel Award 2004, Outstanding Lead Actress - Iron (nominee)
 Obie Awards 2003–2004, Outstanding Performance - Iron (winner)

Filmography

Film

Television

References

External links
 
 
 

American film actresses
American stage actresses
American television actresses
Living people
Actresses from Pittsburgh
Circle in the Square Theatre School alumni
21st-century American women
Year of birth missing (living people)